The 1994 Kentucky Derby was the 120th running of the Kentucky Derby. The race took place on May 7, 1994. There were 130,594 in attendance. Rain made this the first sloppy track since 1948.

Payout
The 120th Kentucky Derby Payout Schedule

 $2 Exacta: (6-5)  Paid   $184.80
 $2 Trifecta: (6-5-10)  Paid   $2,351.40

Full results

 Winning Breeder: Pamela duPont Darmstadt; (KY)

References

1994
Kentucky Derby
Derby
Kentucky
Kentucky Derby